Kathryn Rossetter is an American acting teacher and actress who is best known for her role in a Broadway production of Death of a Salesman (1984) as well as its 1985 TV movie adaptation.

Career

Acting
She has appeared in films such as The Night We Never Met (1993), Speed 2: Cruise Control (1997), Fearless (1993), and The Unidentified (2008). She also voiced Edna the cook in the 2006 video game Bully (video game).

On the television she acted in shows such as Law & Order: Special Victims Unit, Kate & Allie and L.A. Law.

As well as "Death of a Salesman, she has performed in theater in "The Good Coach" (1989), "Love Lemmings" (1991), and "The Time of the Cuckoo" (2000).

Teaching
Rossetter teaches acting, and is the head of the Master of Fine Arts Acting Department at The New School where she teaches Contemporary Technique, and also teaches a Chekhov Scene Study class at the New Studio. She also does one-to-one coaching for actors.

#MeToo movement

Rossetter co-starred with Dustin Hoffman in both the Broadway production and TV movie adaptation of Death of a Salesman in the mid-1980s. In 2017 during the #MeToo movement, Rossetter alleged that Hoffman had sexually assaulted her during these productions. Hoffman never officially responded to Rossetter's allegations.

Filmography

References

External links
 
 Kathryn Rossetter: Official site
 Kathryn Rossetter on Twitter

Actresses from Pennsylvania
Living people
20th-century American actresses
American film actresses
American television actresses
Year of birth missing (living people)
People from Abington Township, Montgomery County, Pennsylvania
21st-century American women